Bernard de Tramelay (died 16 August 1153) was the fourth Grand Master of the Knights Templar.

He was born in the castle of Tramelay near Saint-Claude in the Jura. According to Du Cange, he succeeded a certain Hugues as Master of the Temple, although this Hugues is otherwise unknown. He was elected Grand Master in June 1151, after the abdication of Everard des Barres, who had returned to France following the Second Crusade. King Baldwin III of Jerusalem granted him the ruined city of Gaza, which Bernard rebuilt for the Templars.

In 1153 the Templars participated in the Battle of Ascalon, a fortress at that time controlled by Fatimid Egypt. The Templars constructed a siege tower, which was burned down by the Egyptian soldiers inside Ascalon. The wind caught the flames and part of the walls of Ascalon burned down as well.

According to William of Tyre, knights of the Order rushed through the breach without Baldwin's knowledge while Bernard prevented other crusaders from following, as he did not want to share the spoils of the city with the king. Bernard and about forty of his Templars were killed by the larger Egyptian garrison. Their bodies were displayed on the ramparts and their heads were sent to the sultan. Other more modern accounts say that William of Tyre's version may have been distorted, since it may have been based on the defensive accounts given by the army's commanders as to why they did not follow the Templars into the breach.

In yet another differing account by a Damascene chronicler in the city, the breach of the wall is mentioned as a precursor to the fall of the city; he makes no mention of the incident with the Templars. Regardless of which account is believed, Bernard was killed and beheaded during the fighting. A few days later, Baldwin captured the fortress; shortly thereafter, the Templars elected André de Montbard as their Grand Master.

Notes

Sources
Battle of Ascalon: 

1153 deaths
Grand Masters of the Knights Templar
Military personnel killed in action
12th-century French people
Year of birth unknown